Mary MacKillop is Australia's first and only Roman Catholic Saint.

Mary MacKillop may also refer  to:

Mary MacKillop College (disambiguation)
 Mary MacKillop College, Kensington, Adelaide, South Australia
 Mary MacKillop College, Wakeley, Sydney, New South Wales
 Mary MacKillop Catholic Regional College, Leongatha, Victoria
 St Mary MacKillop College, Albury
 St Mary MacKillop College, Canberra
Mary MacKillop Interpretive Centre, Penola, South Australia
Mary Mackillop Memorial Chapel and Museum, North Sydney, New South Wales

See also
MacKillop College (disambiguation)
Electoral district of MacKillop